Brian Holcombe (born 28 July 1941) is a former Australian rules footballer who played with Carlton in the Victorian Football League (VFL).

Notes

External links 

Brian Holcombe's profile at Blueseum

1941 births
Carlton Football Club players
Living people
Australian rules footballers from Victoria (Australia)